The Porteous family is a Scottish Borders armigerous family.

History
The earliest records for members of the Porteous family in Peeblesshire date back to the early part of the fifteenth century.

The earliest possible reference, according to Lord Lyon King of Arms in Edinburgh, is to a Guillaume Porteuse (later William Porteous), who arrived from Normandy c 1400 under the patronage of the wealthy Fraise family (later to become the Frasers). They had already settled in parts of lowland Scotland, having been granted lands by the King.

The early meaning of the name Porteuse (from the French) was indeed possibly of 'courier' or 'messenger'. But in Scotland, they turned their hand to other trades. In the days when the glens and hamlets of Tweeddale and, later, Annandale were much more densely populated than today, they seem to have pursued various occupations – from millers and blacksmiths to ministers of religion.

The home of early members of the Porteous family for many hundreds of years was Hawkshaw in Peeblesshire. The link to modern day families is as yet unproven. There is some doubt as to how long the family had held the ancestral family home, but it is certain that there was a castle of sorts at Hawkshaw, probably built as no more than a small fortified keep, and intended as a watch tower where a signal fire could be lit to warn of approaching danger. A line of these so-called Peel towers was built in the 1430s across the Tweed valley from Berwick to its source, as a response to the dangers of invasion from the English borders. Hawkshaw was one of over two dozen of these in Peeblesshire alone.

During the eighteenth century there began a massive migration of families from Scotland, initially to England and Ireland – and eventually to the New World and the newly discovered countries of the British Empire.

The reasons for this were many – and changed considerably during the following three hundred years. The historical background was turbulent and Scotland saw many changes which led to emigration of large numbers of both Highland and Lowland families.

The Lowland Clearances (1760–1830), especially, resulted in a massive movement of poor Scots from the Lowlands to the growing industrial centres of Glasgow and northern England – to Newcastle, Liverpool and eventually to London and other large cities and ports. Families were tempted by the offer of employment in the fast-growing industries which had burgeoned with the coming of the Industrial Revolution and the promise of a higher standard of living.

The subsequent depopulation of the Lowlands and the Highland Potato Famine of 1836–37 added to those who chose to leave. Over 1.7 million people left Scotland from 1846 to 1852, primarily going to Nova Scotia and Canada. 
They left in vast numbers to seek better fortune on the other side of the Atlantic.

Some notable members of the family
 John Porteous (c 1695–1736) Captain of the City Guard of Edinburgh
 Beilby Porteus (1731–1809), Bishop of Chester and London, noted abolitionist
 Thomas Porteous (1765–1830), merchant and politician, Lower Canada 
 James Porteous (1848–1922), Scottish-American inventor of the Fresno Scraper
 Gladstone Porteous (1874–1944), Australian missionary to China, translator of the Bible into the Yi language 
 Stanley Porteus (1883–1972), Australian psychologist and author 
 Thomas Porteous (c. 1864–1919), footballer for Sunderland and England
 George Porteous (1903–1977), Lieutenant-Governor of Saskatchewan
 Hugh Gordon Porteus (1906–1993), English art and literature critic
 Ian R. Porteous (1930–2011), Scottish mathematician
 John Porteous (1932–1995), Canadian columnist and journalist 
 Norman Walker Porteous (1898–2003), theologian and translator of the New English Bible; last surviving officer of the First World War
 Patrick Porteous VC (1918–2000), Scottish war hero 
 Rose Porteous (1948– ), Filipino-born Australian socialite
 Shane Porteous (1942– ), Australian actor
 Thomas Porteous (1946– ), former US District Court judge
 Timothy Porteous CM (1933–2020), Canadian administrator, former executive assistant to Pierre Trudeau
 Trevor Porteous (1933–97), English footballer for Stockport County F.C.
 William Porteous (1945– ), Australian land developer
 Most Rev Julian Porteous (1949– ), Bishop, Archdiocese of Sydney, Australia

The Porteous family today
Branches of the family having emigrated to five continents, there is an active family research group which seeks to help family members seeking more information about their ancestors. The cairn at Hawkshaw has, over the years, become a place of pilgrimage for members of the Porteous family, and an international reunion was traditionally held at the nearby Crook Inn, Tweedsmuir every five years, attracting visitors from all over the world. In September 2021 it is planned that the celebrations will be held nearby, as the inn has been bought by a Tweedsmuir community group and is currently being refurbished.

See also
 The Lowland Clearances
 Porteous Riots
 Crook Inn
 The Heart of Mid-Lothian

References

External links
 Porteous Research Project
 Porteous Associates family history

Further reading
 Porteous, Barry. The Porteous Story, (Kingston, Ontario, published privately 1975)
 Porteous, Richard. Members of the Porteous Family Killed in World Wars I and II, (Redditch, Worcestershire, England, published privately 2000)
 Porteous, Roger. Porteous Australia, (Melbourne, Victoria, Australia, published privately 1980)

People from the Scottish Borders
Scottish families